Gelkuyeh (also Romanized as Gelkūyeh; also known as Gelkān and Golkān) is a village in Izadkhvast-e Gharbi Rural District, Izadkhvast District, Zarrin Dasht County, Fars Province, Iran. At the 2006 census, its population was 974, in 242 families.

References 

Populated places in Zarrin Dasht County